Lost-n-Found Youth is an Atlanta, Georgia-based organization that assists homeless LGBT youth. The organization, at the time of its 2011 founding was the "only organization actively taking Atlanta's LGBT homeless youth directly off the streets".

History
Lost-n-Found Youth started as a project organized by the Sisters of Perpetual Indulgence to address the need for a homeless shelter to specifically meet the needs of LGBTQ youth in the Atlanta area. The organization, originally known as the Saint Lost and Found project, was founded by Rick Westbrook, Art Izzard, and Paul Swicord. Since its inception, the organization has helped more than 300 young homeless adults.

In 2014, The Human Rights Campaign awarded Lost-n-Found Youth with the Dan Bradley Humanitarian Award.

The organization is converting an Atlanta home that is more than a century old, into a shelter. Saint Mark's United Methodist Church has rented the house to Lost-n-Found Youth for one per year, on a 20-year lease.

References

External links
 https://lnfy.org

LGBT youth organizations based in the United States
Youth organizations based in Georgia (U.S. state)
LGBT culture in Atlanta
Organizations based in Atlanta
Organizations established in 2011
2011 establishments in Georgia (U.S. state)